Ivan John Cable  (August 17, 1934 – July 21, 2021) was a Canadian politician. He served as a member of the Yukon Legislative Assembly from 1992 to 2000, representing the electoral district of Riverside as a member and interim leader of the Yukon Liberal Party. He was first elected in the 1992 election and again in the 1996 election.

He was subsequently appointed the commissioner of Yukon, serving from October 1, 2000 to December 1, 2005.

Born in Hamilton, Ontario, he practiced law in Whitehorse for 21 years. As a public servant, he has been director of the Northern Canada Power Commission, president of its successor Yukon Energy Corporation, a founding member of Recycle Organics Together Society, director of Yukon Science Institute, a member of the Advisory Committee of the Salvation Army Adult Residential Centre and president of the Yukon Chamber of Commerce.

He is also a member of the Learning Disabilities Association of the Yukon, the Association of Professional Engineers of the Yukon and founding member of Boreal Alternate Energy Centre.

He held a degree in chemical engineering from University of Toronto, an MBA from McMaster University and a Bachelor of Law from the University of Western Ontario.

Cable was appointed to the Order of Yukon in 2020. Cable died in July 2021 at the age of 86.

References

1934 births
2021 deaths
Commissioners of Yukon
McMaster University alumni
Politicians from Whitehorse
Politicians from Hamilton, Ontario
University of Toronto alumni
University of Western Ontario alumni
Yukon Liberal Party leaders
Yukon Liberal Party MLAs
Members of the Order of Yukon